Juszczyk is a Polish surname. Notable people with the surname include:

Kyle Juszczyk (born 1991), American footballer
Marcin Juszczyk (born 1985), Polish footballer

Polish-language surnames